Kishwer Zehra is a Pakistani politician who has been a member of the National Assembly of Pakistan, since August 2018. Previously she was member of the National Assembly from March 2008 to May 2018.

Political career
Zehra was elected to the National Assembly of Pakistan as a candidate of Muttahida Qaumi Movement (MQM) from Sindh in the 2008 Pakistani general election. She was re-elected to the National Assembly as a candidate of MQM from Sindh in 2013 Pakistani general election as well as to the National Assembly as a candidate of MQM-P from Sindh in 2018 Pakistani general election.

In 2019, Zehra submitted a bill in the National Assembly which sought the creation of eight new provinces in Pakistan. It was met with great criticism from the Pakistan Peoples Party at centre and in Sindh. On 27 July 2020, Zehra was unanimously elected chairperson of the standing committee on cabinet secretariat.

In the previous parliament, she was nominated for the office of the prime minister of Pakistan, when Nawaz Sharif was disqualified by the Supreme Court of Pakistan amid the Panama Papers Case. She later withdrew her name from consideration to become the prime minister in favour of PML-N's Shahid Khaqan Abbasi. He was sworn in as the new prime minister on August 1, 2017.

She is one of the candidates for the office of the governor of Sindh being considered by the federal government after the resignation of Imran Ismail, who resigned in protest against the ouster of former prime minister Imran Khan.

References

Living people
People from Sindh
Muttahida Qaumi Movement MNAs
Pakistani MNAs 2013–2018
Pakistani MNAs 2008–2013
Women members of the National Assembly of Pakistan
Year of birth missing (living people)
Pakistani MNAs 2018–2023
21st-century Pakistani women politicians